Kirill Gennadiyevich Ikonnikov (born 5 March 1984, in Leningrad) is a male hammer thrower from Russia. His personal best throw is 79.20 metres, achieved in June 2008 in Zhukovsky.

Doping
He was serving a 2-year competition ban for the use of a prohibited substance, Dehydrochloromethyltestosterone, lasting from 8 October 2012 to 1 November 2014.

Samples taken during the 2012 Olympics were retested in 2016.  On October 27, 2016 it was announced that Ikonnikov tested positive for dehydrochlormethyltestosterone (turinabol) and his results from the 2012 Olympics, 2 months before the previous ban, were also disqualified.

International competitions

See also
List of doping cases in athletics

References

sports-reference

1984 births
Living people
Athletes from Saint Petersburg
Russian male hammer throwers
Olympic male hammer throwers
Olympic athletes of Russia
Athletes (track and field) at the 2008 Summer Olympics
Athletes (track and field) at the 2012 Summer Olympics
World Athletics Championships athletes for Russia
Russian Athletics Championships winners
Doping cases in athletics
Russian sportspeople in doping cases